The Upper Laos caecilian (Ichthyophis laosensis) is a species of amphibian in the family Ichthyophiidae. It is endemic to Laos and only known from a single specimen (holotype) collected from the imprecise type locality, "Upper Laos". Presumably a  tropical moist forest species, nothing definite is known about its habitat or ecology.

References

Ichthyophis
Amphibians of Laos
Endemic fauna of Laos
Amphibians described in 1969
Taxonomy articles created by Polbot